Kilcoe railway station was on the Schull and Skibbereen Railway in County Cork, Ireland.

History

The station opened on 6 September 1886.

Regular passenger services were withdrawn on 27 January 1947.

Routes

Further reading

References

Disused railway stations in County Cork
Railway stations opened in 1886
Railway stations closed in 1947